The 1979–80 season was the 24th season of the Liga Nacional de Baloncesto. Real Madrid won the title.

Teams and venues

Team Standings

Stats Leaders

Points

References

ACB.com 
Linguasport 

Liga Española de Baloncesto (1957–1983) seasons
 
Spanish